Diego Lopes da Silva Maia or Diego Maia (born 3 February 1990) is a Brazilian football defender.

Career
Diego Maia signed for Tupi Football Club in January 2014. Diego Maia joined Associação Atlética Portuguesa (RJ) in 2016, and has appeared in over 100 competitive matches for the club.

References

External links 

1990 births
Living people
Brazilian footballers
Association football defenders
Associação Atlética Portuguesa (RJ) players
Footballers from Rio de Janeiro (city)